This is a list of colleges and universities in Baku, Azerbaijan.

List of the public and private higher education enterprises in Baku

See also

 List of universities in Azerbaijan
 Education in Azerbaijan
 Education in the Soviet Union (Historical)

References

 The Ministry of Education of Azerbaijan Republic, http://tehsil.gov.az/view.php?lang=en&menu=339&id=1696 , access date: 7 September 2010
 State higher educational institutions at the beginning of 2011/2012 academic year, The State Statistical Committee of the Republic of Azerbaijan, https://web.archive.org/web/20130509022946/http://www.stat.gov.az/source/education/indexen.php, access date: 26 March 2013

Azerbaijan education-related lists
Education in Baku
Baku-related lists
Baku